Istgah-e Bisheh (also Romanized as Īstgāh-e Bīsheh; also known as Bīsheh) is a village in Sepiddasht Rural District, Central District, Dorud County, Lorestan Province, Iran. At the 2006 census, its population was 604, in 132 families.

The Bisheh waterfall, one of the Lorestan's tourist attractions located in this village.

References 

Towns and villages in Dorud County